Ma Yanlong (born March 26, 1990) is a Chinese male curler. He played on third position for China on 2013 Winter Universiade.

Teams and events

Men's

Mixed doubles

References

External links
 

 Video: 

1995 births
Living people
Chinese male curlers